"'Phraates'" is the Greek transliteration of Parthian Farhad.
Five kings of Parthian Empire were named Phraates (Parthian: Frahāt, Persian: Farhad (فرهاد)
Phraates I c. 176–171 BC
Phraates II c. 132–127 BC
Phraates III c. 69–57 BC
Phraates IV c. 38–2 BC
Phraates V (Phraataces) c. 2 BC–AD 4

See also
 Farhad, the modern Persian form of the name